LAN Dominicana (formerly and legally Líneas Aéreas Nacionales de Navegación Dominicana S.A.) was an airline based in Santo Domingo, Dominican Republic that operated international services.

History
The airline was established in May 2003 and started operations on June 16, 2003. LAN Airlines had a 49% stake in LAN Dominicana. In April 2005, the IATA code "4M" was reassigned to Aero 2000, which was officially designated as LAN Argentina in June 2005.

Destinations

Fleet
LAN Dominicana had operated the following aircraft:
2 Boeing 767-300ER (Operated by LAN Airlines)

See also
List of defunct airlines of the Dominican Republic

References

External links
LAN
Dominican Aviation Route Info

Airlines established in 2003
Airlines disestablished in 2005
LAN Airlines
Defunct airlines of the Dominican Republic